For information on all Wofford College sports, see Wofford Terriers

The Wofford Terriers football program is the intercollegiate American football team for Wofford College located in the U.S. state of South Carolina. The team competes in the NCAA Division I Football Championship Subdivision (FCS) as members of the Southern Conference (SoCon). Wofford's first football team was fielded in 1889. The team plays its home games at the 13,000 seat Gibbs Stadium in Spartanburg, South Carolina. Josh Conklin is the current head coach for the Terriers.

History
Wofford moved from Division II to join the Division I-AA Southern Conference in the 96-97 season.  Since then, Wofford has won 7 Southern Conference Championships, and received bids to the FCS Playoffs 10 times with the most recent bid coming in 2019.  Wofford is typically one of the strongest teams in the Southern Conference every year.  Wofford's best finish since moving from Division II was a trip to the National Semi-finals at Delaware in 2003, where they fell 24-9.  Mike Ayers, Wofford's winningest and most honored coach who served as head coach for thirty years, retired following the 2017 season, when Wofford made it to the national quarterfinals and finished #8 in the national polls.  In recent years, Wofford's football and other athletic teams have finished near the top in the country in APR, which measures athletic performance of athletes.  Numerous football players have been elected to Phi Beta Kappa.

Classifications
 1957–1969: NAIA
 1970–1987: NAIA Division I
 1988–1994: NCAA Division II
 1995–present: NCAA Division I–AA/FCS

Conference memberships
 1889–1900: Independent
 1901–1941: Southern Intercollegiate Athletic Association
 1942–1945: Independent
 1946–1964: South Carolina Little Three
 1965–1987: NAIA Independent
 1988–1994: NCAA Division II independent
 1995–1996: NCAA Division I–AA independent
 1997–present: Southern Conference

Conference championships
Wofford has won seven conference championships, three outright and four shared.

† denotes co–champions

Bowl game appearances

Playoff appearances

NCAA Division I-AA/FCS
The Terriers have appeared in the I-AA/FCS playoffs ten times with an overall record of 9–10.

NCAA Division II
The Terriers have appeared in the Division II playoffs two times with an overall record of 0–2.

NAIA
The Terriers appeared in the NAIA playoffs one time. Their combined record was 1–1.

Wofford vs. in-state NCAA Division I schools

Notable former players

 Brenton Bersin, former wide receiver for the Carolina Panthers of the National Football League (NFL)
 Miles Brown, former defensive lineman for the Tennessee Titans
 Fisher DeBerry, former head coach at Air Force and College Football Hall of Famer
 Ameet Pall, former defensive end in the Canadian Football League (CFL)
 Kasey Redfern, former NFL punter
 Jerry Richardson, wide receiver for the Baltimore Colts, former owner of the Carolina Panthers.
 Nate Woody, defensive Coordinator at Army

References

External links
 

 
American football teams established in 1889
1889 establishments in South Carolina